Justice is the philosophical concept of the morally correct assignment of goods and evils.

Justice or Justices may also refer to:

Common uses
 Justice (economics), a subcategory of welfare economics
 Justice (virtue), one of the four cardinal virtues
 Criminal justice, the delivery of justice to those who have committed crimes
 Distributive justice, a socially just allocation of goods
 Global justice, an issue in political philosophy
 Lady Justice, the Roman personification of justice
 Retributive justice, a theory of punishment
 Social justice, a concept of fair relations between the individual and society

Law and politics 
 Justice (Armenia), a progressive electoral coalition in Armenia
 JUSTICE, a UK human rights and law reform organisation
 Justice (title), a title of certain classes of judge
 "Justice", a Harvard University course taught by Michael J. Sandel, published on TV, book and online
 Justice?, a 1990s campaign against the UK's Criminal Justice and Public Order Act 1994
 Justice (electronic court filing system), the case management and electronic court filing system for most of the Russian courts

Places 
 Justice, Illinois, a village in Cook County
 Justice, North Carolina, an unincorporated community in Franklin County
 Justice, Oklahoma, a census-designated place in Rogers County
 Justice, West Virginia, a census-designated place in Mingo County
 Justices, West Virginia, an unincorporated community in Roane County, also known as Left Hand
 Deera Square, also known as Justice Square

People 
 Justice (singer) (born 1985), an American pop recording artist
 Justice, a member of the American Gladiators
 Justice, a female professional wrestler from the Gorgeous Ladies of Wrestling
 Justice, one half of the tag-team The American Eagles
 Justice (given name), includes a list of people with the given name
 Justice (surname), includes a list of people with the surname

Arts, entertainment, and media

Fictional entities
 Justice (comics), various entities
 Justice (Guilty Gear), a character in the fighting video game Guilty Gear
 Justice, the main antagonist in the anime Afro Samurai
 Justice, a potential companion in the video game Dragon Age: Origins – Awakening
 Apollo Justice (character), a character in the Ace Attorney series
 Justice Strauss, a character in the A Series of Unfortunate Events books
 Ultraman Justice, a character from the third Ultraman Cosmos movie Ultraman Cosmos vs. Ultraman Justice: The Final Battle
Justice, a character from the video game Helltaker

Films 
 Justice (1914 film), a British silent crime film directed by Frank Wilson
 Justice (1917 film), a British silent crime film directed by Maurice Elvey
 Justice (1993 film) (German:Justiz), a German film directed by Hans W. Geißendörfer
 Justice (2002 film), a Japanese short film
 Justice (2023 film), an American documentary film
 Seeking Justice, also known as Justice, a 2011 American film starring Nicolas Cage

Literature
 Justice (play), a 1910 British play by John Galsworthy
 Justice: What's the Right Thing to Do?, the book accompanying Michael Sandel's course

Music 
 Justice (band), a French electronic duo
 Justice (Steve Camp album), 1988
 Justice (Glay album), 2013
 Justice (Molly Hatchet album), 2010
 Justice (Rev Theory album), 2011
Justice (Justin Bieber album), 2021
 Cross (Justice album), alternatively known as Justice on the iTunes Store in certain countries
 "Justice" (song), a 1983 single by Paul Haig
 "Justice", a song by Krokus from Hellraiser
 "Justice", a song by Robert Forster from Danger in the Past

Periodicals
 Justice (newspaper), a newspaper of the British Social Democratic Federation
 Justice Weekly, a defunct Canadian erotic magazine
 The Justice (newspaper), an independent weekly student newspaper at Brandeis University founded in 1949

Television

Programs
 Justice (1971 TV series), a 1971–1974 British TV series
 Justice (2006 TV series), an American legal-themed television show on Fox
 Justice (2011 TV series), a British legal drama
 Justice with Judge Jeanine, a legal affairs series starring Jeanine Pirro on Fox News Channel
 Justice (South Korean TV series), a South Korean television series
 Justice: Qalb Al Adala, a 2017 Abu Dhabi legal procedural drama television series

Episodes
 "Justice" (Death Note episode)
 "Justice" (Red Dwarf), a 1991 episode of the science fiction sitcom
 "Justice" (Star Trek: The Next Generation) (TNG: Star Trek: The Next Generation)
 "Justice", an episode of Smallville

Channels
 Justice Network, a television network in the United States

Other arts
 Justice (Titian) or Judith, a c.1508 dry fresco
 Justice (sculpture), a 1991 statue by Diana K. Moore

Other uses
 Justice (Tarot card), a Major Arcana card in Tarot
 Justice (store), a children's clothing retailer
 Justice Sunday, a series of religious conferences
 ST Justice, an Admiralty tugboat
 Justice, Inc. (role-playing game), a simulation of adventure stories in 1930s pulp magazines
 Justice (ethics), the fair selection of research participants

See also 
 Injustice (disambiguation)
 Justis (disambiguation)
 Justus (disambiguation)
 Judge (disambiguation)